Velars are a type of consonant.

Velar may also refer to:
 Velar vowels, more commonly referred to as back vowels
 Velar veins, or internal cerebral veins
 Velar, Rajasthan, a village in India
 Range Rover Velar, a make of car

See also 
 Valar
 Vilar (disambiguation)